Ben Knowle is a 1.5 hectare geological Site of Special Scientific Interest in Somerset, notified in 1984.

Ben Knowle is a natural outcrop of Celestine rising from the Somerset Levels where contacts with the host rock, Tea Green Marl, can be seen which illustrate the stratigraphic setting of the mineral deposit.

References

External links
 English Nature website (SSSI information)

Sites of Special Scientific Interest in Somerset
Sites of Special Scientific Interest notified in 1984
Geology of Somerset